The Mauritius national basketball team is the national basketball team from Mauritius. They have yet to appear in the FIBA World Championship or the FIBA Africa Championship.

External links
Afrobasket.com - Mauritius Men National Team

Men's national basketball teams
Basketball
Basketball in Mauritius